Andreas Laskaratos (1 May 1811 – 23/24 July 1901) was a satirical poet and writer from the Ionian island of  Cefalonia (or Kefallinia), representative of the Heptanese School (literature). He was excommunicated by the Greek Orthodox Church because his satire targeted many of the church's prominent members.

Biography 

Andreas Laskaratos was born in Lixouri in 1811, at the time when the Ionian islands were moving from the French to the British as a protectorate. He was considered to be highly spirited by nature, intelligent and glib. He was intensely satirical and constant in his views, publishing works which contrasted the views of his time. The fact that he did not hesitate to freely express his views by criticizing hypocrisy became the main reason behind his arrest and imprisonment, persecutions, and excommunication by the church.

He lived through the entire process of unification of the Ionian islands with mainland Greece but he distanced himself from the opinions of most leaders of the pro-unification movement. During his persecution he lived at times in Corfu, Zakynthos, London and Argostoli, where he died in 1901.

Being brought up in a wealthy aristocratic family of land-owners, he studied law in Paris, but only practised law when he was in financial need. He was the student of the great poet Andreas Kalvos and also met Greece's 'national poet' Dionysios Solomos, both of whom influenced his later course. He worked as a journalist and published poetry but is more well known as a writer of satire. He married Penelope Korgialeniou (Πηνελόπη Κοργιαλένιου), also from a wealthy family, who bore him two sons and seven daughters. His niece Eleni Lambiri was a conductor, librettist and composer.

He published several satirical newspapers such as Lychnos (Λύχνος) that criticized immorality, injustice and hypocrisy. On many occasions he turned against politicians and their incompetence while he also fought against religious prejudices and the corruption of religious authority.

His main works include:

 (Τα μυστήρια της Κεφαλονιάς) "The mysteries of Cephalonia"
 (Ιδού ο άνθρωπος ή ανθρώπινοι χαρακτήρες) "Ecce homo or human characters"
 (Ποιήματα και ανέκδοτα) "Poems and anecdotes"
 (Οι καταδρομές μου εξαιτίας του «Λύχνου») "The troubles Lychnos caused me"
 (Απόκριση στον αφορισμό) "Response to aphorism"
Aftoviografia (Αυτοβιογραφία) "Autobiography"

Anecdotal Incidents 

 On his birthday, a neighbour in order to make fun of him sent him a basket full of goat's horns (implying his wife's adultery) with the inscription "For your birthday". Laskaratos replied by sending him a basket full of flowers: "One can only give away what one has in plenty".

Published works 

Poiimata (Ποιήματα) "Poems", ed. Φέξης, Athens, 1916
Stochasmoi (Στοχασμοί) "Ponderings", ed. Γανιάρης και Σία (Ganiaris et co.), 1921
 (Ήθη, έθιμα και δοξασίες της Κεφαλλονιάς) "Ways, mores and beliefs of Cephalonia", ed. Ελευθερουδάκης, Athens, 1924
Aftoviogrfafia (Αυτοβιογραφία) "Autobiography", ed. Δημητράκος, Athens, 1927
 (Τα παθήματά μου και οι παρατηρήσεις μου στις φυλακές της Κεφαλλονιάς) "My misfortunes and observations in the jail of Cephalonia", ed. Κοντομάρης και Σία, Athens, 1930
Techni tou dimigorein kai singrafein (Τέχνη του δημηγορείν και συγγράφειν) "Art of declaiming and writing", ed. Κολιατσάδα, Athens, 1954
Poiimata (Ποιήματα), ed. Μαρής, Athens, 1958
Apanta (3 volumes) (Άπαντα) "Omnibus", Athens, 1959
Viografika mou enthimimata (Βιογραφικά μου ενθυμήματα) "My biographical rememberings", Athens, 1966
Idou o anthropos (Ιδού ο άνθρωπος), ed. Πάπυρος, Athens, 1969
Idou o anthropos (Ιδού ο άνθρωπος), ed. Ερμής, 1970
 (Ένα ανέκδοτο ποίημα) "An unpublished poem", ed. Κείμενα, 1976
Poiimata (Ποιήματα), ed. Μαρής, Athens, 1976
Aftoviografia (Αυτοβιογραφία), ed. Γνώση, Athens, 1983
Idou o anthropos (Ιδού ο άνθρωπος), ed. Νέος σταθμός, Athens, 2001
Reflections, tr. Simon Darragh, Aiora Press, Athens, 2015

References
Parts of the article were based on the content of the website http://www.kefalonitis.com (and are published under permission).

External links
In Greek
Biographical note
Second biographical note
The mysteries of Cephalonia on Scribd

Greek male poets
People from Paliki
Heptanese School (literature)
Criticism of Eastern Orthodox Church
People excommunicated by the Greek Orthodox Church
1811 births
1901 deaths
19th-century Greek poets
19th-century male writers